Paul Rutledge (born 30 July 1962) is a New Zealand cricketer. He played in five first-class and two List A matches for Canterbury in 1982/83.

See also
 List of Canterbury representative cricketers

References

External links
 

1962 births
Living people
New Zealand cricketers
Canterbury cricketers
Cricketers from Christchurch